Jimmy Hotz is an American inventor, record producer, recording engineer, electronic music pioneer, audio expert, author and musician.

Background 
Hotz began playing guitar at the age of seven.

He plays a number of instruments such as the guitar, keyboards, flute, drums and his own inventions such as the "Hotz Box" and the "Hotz MIDI Translator". Hotz has done a number of recordings where all of the instruments were played by him using only the Hotz Box as an input device.

In the music business Jimmy Hotz has worked with Fleetwood Mac, Dave Mason, NSYNC, Mobius 8  B.B. King, Yes, Jon Anderson, Haven and dozens of other recording artists as either a producer, engineer, mixer, studio musician, or musical instrument designer. Hotz was engineer and did programming on B.B. King's Grammy-nominated King of the Blues: 1989. Hotz was also the engineer on King's Grammy-nominated "Standing on the Edge of Love", for Best Contemporary Blues Recording in 1988 (from The Color of Money soundtrack).

You Rock Guitar featured a video of Jimmy playing their MIDI guitar through the Hotz Midi Translator software.

In 2011 he released his debut novel, The Gates of Time.

Hotz lived and worked in Southern California while developing his inventions.

Inventions
He is noted for his pioneering work with electronic music synthesizer MIDI controller development / programming and as a technical consultant to Microsoft, Intel, Electronic Arts, Atari, JBL and other concerns for new product development.

He is the inventor of the "Hotz Box", Hotz "MIDI vest" and the "Atari Hotz Box", "Hotz MIDI Translator", computer software which has won interest and acclaim at the annual NAMM Show. Performers such as Mick Fleetwood, Jon Anderson, Paul Haslinger, Scott Gershin and others have been using Hotz products in their creative work.

He is the inventor of numerous electronic devices and software innovations and has received three US Patents in music technology.

As an expert in 3D computer graphics, Hotz was the chief visionary behind the 3dMAxMedia "Zuma Project", assembling the team which developed the technology to manipulate 3D imagery in real-time with audio, MIDI and other real-time control devices).

"Zuma" won a 2001 Innovation award from Computer Graphics World Magazine and was used on the 2001 NSYNC PopOdyssey tour.

Patents
 US Patent No. 5,099,738: "MIDI Musical Translator"
 US Patent No. 5,502,274: "Electronic musical instrument for playing along with prerecorded music and method of operation."
 US Patent No. 5,619,003: "Electronic musical instrument dynamically responding to varying chord and scale input information."
 European Patent No. EP 0452347 B1: "Universal Electronic Musical Instrument Controller"

Solo work
He recorded a solo album, Beyond the Crystal Sea, in the late 70s, which was released in 1980. It is listed as one of the Top 100 Christian Rock Albums of All Time, No. 98 and one of  CCM's 500 Best Albums Of All Time No. 210.
It is also considered one of, if not the best example of "Christian Art Rock" by critics and collectors.

His music project, The Gates of Time, was recorded using Hotz' invention, the Hotz Box along with the Hotz MIDI Translator software, which were the primary instruments.

Discography

With various artists

References

External links
 

1953 births
20th-century American businesspeople
21st-century American businesspeople
20th-century American singers
21st-century American singers
American audio engineers
American electronic musicians
20th-century American inventors
21st-century American inventors
American male composers
20th-century American composers
Record producers from Texas
American rock guitarists
American male guitarists
American session musicians
American male singer-songwriters
Businesspeople from California
Lead guitarists
Living people
One-man bands
People from Sherman, Texas
Progressive rock guitarists
Singer-songwriters from California
Singer-songwriters from Texas
20th-century American guitarists
21st-century American guitarists
Guitarists from California
Guitarists from Texas
20th-century American male singers
21st-century American male singers